Yamskaya is a rural locality (a village) in Kemskoye Rural Settlement, Nikolsky District, Vologda Oblast, Russia. The population was 28 as of 2002.

Geography 
Yamskaya is located 60 km southwest of Nikolsk (the district's administrative centre) by road. Nikolskoye is the nearest rural locality.

References 

Rural localities in Nikolsky District, Vologda Oblast